Xemu may refer to:

 Xenu, also known as Xemu, a figure in Scientology beliefs
 NASA's Exploration Extravehicular Mobility Unit, also known as xEMU